KURR (103.1 FM) is a radio station broadcasting a CHR/Top 40 format. Licensed to Hildale, Utah, United States, until November 2008, the station relayed 99.9 KONY Country to the Hurricane, Utah area and then aired Christmas music; shortly after Christmas it started broadcasting Adult Hits under the moniker "George FM". As of February 2010, the station was named "Mix 103.1"

References

External links

URR
Radio stations established in 1993
1993 establishments in Utah
Contemporary hit radio stations in the United States